Belgium has been participating at the Deaflympics since its inception in 1924 and has earned a total of 85 medals.

Belgium yet to compete at the Winter Deaflympics.

Medal tallies

See also
Belgium at the Paralympics
Belgium at the Olympics

References

External links
Deaflympics official website
2017 Deaflympics

Nations at the Deaflympics
Deaflympics
Parasports in Belgium